2022 college football season may refer to:

American leagues
2022 NCAA Division I FBS football season
2022 NCAA Division I FCS football season
2022 NCAA Division II football season
2022 NCAA Division III football season
2022 NAIA football season

Non-American leagues
2022 U Sports football season